The 2007 Scotties Tournament of Hearts, Canada's women's curling championship, was held February 17–25 at the ENMAX Centre in Lethbridge, Alberta. It marks the first year under the Scotties brand name.  The winner was the defending champions Team Canada, under skip Kelly Scott.

Teams

Standings

Schedule
Times are Mountain Standard Time

Draw 1
February 17, 2:00 PM MT

Draw 2
February 17, 6:30 PM MT

Draw 3
February 18, 8:30 AM MT

Draw 4
February 18, 15:00

Draw 5February 18, 6:00 PM MTDraw 6February 19, 8:30 AM MTDraw 7February 19, 1:00 PMDraw 8February 19, 6:00 PM MTDraw 9February 20, 8:30 AM MTDraw 10February 20, 1:00 PM MTDraw 11February 20, 6:00 PM MTDraw 12February 21, 8:30 AM MTDraw 13February 21, 1:00 PM MTDraw 14February 21, 7:30 PM MTDraw 15February 22, 8:30 AM MTDraw 16February 22, 1:00 PM MTDraw 17February 22, 6:00 PM MTTie-breaker 1February 23, 8:30 AM MTTie-breaker 2February 23, 1:00 PM MTPlayoffs

1 vs. 2February 23, 6:00 PM MT3 vs. 4 gameFebruary 23, 6:00 PM MTSemi-finalFebruary 24, 12:30 PM MTFinalFebruary 25, 11:30 AM MTPercentages
(final round robin)

Qualification playdowns
Teams qualified for their provincial playdowns (to be played in late January/early February) are as follows:

Alberta
The Alberta Scotties Tournament of Hearts was held from Jan. 24 to 28th at the Grande Prairie Curling Club in Grande Prairie.

Tie-breaker: Webster 7-5 Sonnenberg 
Semi-final: Bernard 9-4 Webster  
Final: Bernard 7-4 King

British Columbia
The BC Scotties Tournament of Hearts was held from Jan. 24 to 28th at the Kamloops Curling Club in Kamloops.

Tie-breaker: MacInnes 8-2 Clark; MacInnes 6-5 Sanders 
Semi-final: Knezevic 8-5 MacInnes 
Final: Law 10-4 KnezevicDefending champion Kelly Scott will be representing Team Canada at the national Scotties Tournament of Hearts.Manitoba
The Manitoba Scotties Tournament of Hearts was held from Jan. 24 to 28th at the Southern Manitoba Convention Centre Arena in Morris.

Tie-breakers: Jones 7-6 Park; Jenion 9-5 Brown  
Red 1 vs. Black 1: Robertson 9-8 Streich 
Red 2 vs. Black 2: Jones 9-8 Jenion 
Semi-final: Jones 13-5 Streich 
Final: Jones 9-6 Robertson

New Brunswick
The New Brunswick Scotties Tournament of Hearts was held from Jan. 23 to 28th at the Capital Winter Club in Fredericton.

Semi-final: Kelly 9-6 Adams 
Final: Comeau 4-1 Kelly

Newfoundland and Labrador
The Newfoundland and Labrador Scotties Tournament of Hearts was held from Jan. 24 to 27th at the St. John's Curling Club in St. John's.

Final: Strong 7-4 Cunningham

Nova Scotia
The Nova Scotia Scotties Tournament of Hearts was held from Jan. 23 to 28th at the Liverpool Curling Club in Liverpool.

Tie-breaker: Sinclair 6-5 McConnery 
1 vs. 2: Mouzar 9-2 Zinck 
3 vs. 4: Arsenault 8-4 Sinclair 
Semi-final: Zinck 4-3 Arsenault  
Final: Mouzar 4-2 Zinck

Defending champion Colleen Jones'' is playing third for Kay Zinck.

Ontario

The Ontario Scotties Tournament of Hearts was held from Jan. 22 to 28th at the Dixie Curling Club in Mississauga.

1 vs. 2: Scharf 11-5 Hanna 
3 vs. 4: Middaugh 10-4 Goring 
Semi-final: Middaugh 8-7 Hanna 
Final: Scharf 7-5 Middaugh

Prince Edward Island
The PEI Scotties Tournament of Hearts was held from Jan. 18 to 22nd at the Western Community Curling Club in Alberton. Instead of a round robin format, a triple-knock out system was employed. No playoff was necessary as Gaudet went undefeated.

Quebec
The Quebec Scotties Tournament of Hearts were held from Jan. 22 to 28th at the Sherbrooke Curling Club in Sherbrooke.

Tie-breakers: Bélisle 5-3 Gagnon; Bélisle 7-1 Brassard  
A1 vs. B1: Osborne 12-6 Nicholls 
A2 vs. B2: Bélisle 11-6 Néron 
Semi-final: Nicholls 5-4 Bélisle  
Final: Osborne 10-6 Nicholls

Saskatchewan
The Saskatchewan Scotties Tournament of Hearts was held from Jan. 31 to Feb. 4 at the Balgonie Curling Club in Balgonie.

Semi-final: Lawton 13-7 Englot 
Final: Betker 9-6 Lawton

Yukon / Northwest Territories
The Yukon/Northwest Territories Women's Championship was held from Jan. 25 to 28th at the Whitehorse Curling Club in Whitehorse, Yukon. No playoffs occurred.

Notes

References

External links
Final on YouTube
Tiebreaker on YouTube

Scotties Tournament of Hearts
Sport in Lethbridge
Scotties Tournament Of Hearts, 2007
2007 in Canadian curling
Curling competitions in Alberta
2007 in women's curling